W.A.K.O. European Championships 2004 in Budva were the joint seventeenth European championships (the other event would be held the next month in Maribor, Slovenia) and were the fourth W.A.K.O. championships (including world) to be held in Serbia and Montenegro/Yugoslavia.  The event was open to around 300 amateur men and women from 26 nations from across Europe.
  
The styles on offer at Budva included; Full-Contact, Low-Kick and Thai-Boxing – with women's Thai-Boxing competitions introduced for the very first time at a W.A.K.O. championships.  The other less physical competitions (Light and Semi-Contact, Musical Forms, Aero Kickboxing) would take place at the event in Maribor.  By the end of the championships Russia was easily the top nation with a huge medal collection across all styles, hosts Serbia and Montenegro trailed way behind in second and Belarus were in third.  The event was held over six days in Budva, Serbia and Montenegro, starting on Tuesday, 19 October and ending on Sunday, 24 October 2004.

Full-Contact

Full-Contact is a form of kickboxing where both punches and kicks are exchanged between participants with full force applied to strikes, and attacks below the waist are prohibited.  Most matches are settled either via a point's decision or stoppage victory and all contestants are obliged to wear head and body protection as is customary with most forms of amateur kickboxing.  More information on Full-Contact and the rules can be found at the official W.A.K.O. website. At Budva the men had twelve weight divisions ranging from 51 kg/112.2 lbs to over 91 kg/+200.2 lbs, while the women had seven ranging from 48 kg/105.6 lbs to over 70 kg/+143 lbs.  Although there was not the same number of high-profile winners in Full-Contact as with previous championships, there were several repeat winners who had won at the last world championships in Paris, with Jere Reinikainen, Igor Kulbaev, Maxim Voronov, Olesya Gladkova and Maria Karlova all winning gold, while Milorad Gajović would go on to compete in the 2008 Olympics as an amateur boxer.  By the end of the championships Russia was the strongest nation in the style, winning a huge haul of ten gold, four silvers and four bronze medals across the male and female events.

Men's Full-Contact Kickboxing Medals Table

Women's Full-Contact Kickboxing Medals Table

Low-Kick

Similar to Full-Contact kickboxing, contestants in Low-Kick are allowed to kick and punch one another with full force, with the primary difference being that in Low-Kick they are also allowed to kick one another's legs, with matches typically won by decision or stoppage.  As with other forms of amateur kickboxing, various head and body protection must be worn.  More information on the style can be found at the W.A.K.O. website. Both men and women took part in Low-Kick at Budva, with the men having twelve weight divisions ranging from 51 kg/112.2 lbs to over 91 kg/+200.2 lbs, and then women having six ranging from 48 kg/105.6 lbs to 70 kg/154 lbs.  Notable winners included future K-1 fighters Michał Głogowski and Łukasz Jarosz, while Dejan Milosavljevic had also won gold at the last European championships in Jesolo.  By the end of the event, as with Full-Contact Russia were easily the strongest nation in Low-Kick, winning a massive ten gold, six silver and two bronze medals across the various male and female competitions.

Men's Low-Kick Kickboxing Medals Table

Women's Low-Kick Kickboxing Medals Table

Thai-Boxing

The most physical type of kickboxing available at Budva, Thai-Boxing (more commonly known as Muay Thai allows the participants to kick, punch, use elbows and knees to score points, often resulting in a stoppage victory.  As with other forms of amateur kickboxing all contestants must wear head and body protection.  At Budva both men and women took part in their own Thai-Boxing competitions with women competing for the first time at a W.A.K.O. championships.  The men had twelve weight classes ranging from 51 kg/112.2 lbs to over 91 kg/+200.2 lbs, while the women had just the two, the 51 kg/114.4 lbs and 65 kg/143 lbs divisions.  There were not many recognisable names on the winners list at Budva although future pro world champion and K-1 contestant Magomed Magomedov and emerging talent Andrei Kotsur picked up gold medals.  By the end of the championships Belarus were once more the strongest nation in Thai-Boxing with six gold, two silver and two bronze medals.

Men's Thai-Boxing Medals Table

Women's Thai-Boxing Medals Table

Overall Medals Standing (Top 5)

See also
List of WAKO Amateur European Championships
List of WAKO Amateur World Championships

References

External links
 WAKO World Association of Kickboxing Organizations Official Site

 
2004 Budva
Kickboxing in Montenegro
2004 in kickboxing